The Ministry of Social Security and Labour of the Republic of Lithuania is a government department of the Republic of Lithuania. Its operations are authorized by the Constitution of the Republic of Lithuania, decrees  issued by the President and Prime Minister, and laws passed by the Seimas (Parliament). Its mission is to prosecute state social security and labour branch ruling functions and realize state policy in these branches. The current head of the Ministry is Monika Navickienė.

Ministers

References

 
Social Security and Labour
Lithuania
Lithuania
Labor in Lithuania